KATNBL1 is a protein that in humans is encoded by the KATNBL1 gene.

References

External links

Further reading